Bad Osterfingen is a traditional inn and winery in Osterfingen, Switzerland founded in 1472.

Today domestic wines from the own vineyard are served for visitors in the candlelit ballroom, cosy parlour or in the guest lounge.

See also 
List of oldest companies

References

External links 
 
Location on Google Maps

Restaurants in Switzerland
Hotels in Switzerland
Companies established in the 15th century
15th-century establishments in Switzerland